A War in Hollywood is a 2008 Spanish documentary biography historical film directed by Oriol Porta. It is about the Spanish Civil War which affected Hollywood artists such as Alvah Bessie.

Cast

References

External links
 
 

Spanish documentary films
Spanish biographical films
Spanish historical films
2000s historical films
2000s biographical films
Films shot in California
Documentary films about New York City
Documentary films about the Spanish Civil War
Cultural depictions of Dwight D. Eisenhower
Films about Francisco Franco
Cultural depictions of Ernest Hemingway
Cultural depictions of Hirohito
Films about Adolf Hitler
Documentary films about Adolf Hitler
Documentary films about Benito Mussolini
Films about Franklin D. Roosevelt
Films about Joseph Stalin
2000s American films